This is a list of the Los Premios MTV Latinoamérica winners and nominees for Best Solo Artist.

Latin American music
Latin music musicians
MTV Video Music Awards